Mebusevleri is a neighbourhood in Ankara, Turkey, located in Çankaya district of central Ankara.

Mebusevleri, which means "Houses of Parliamentarians", is bordered by  Anıttepe, Tandoğan and Beşevler neighbourhoods. In addition to these neighbourhoods it is bordered by the Anıtkabir, the mausoleum of Atatürk.

Neighbourhoods of Çankaya